Linda Gary (born Linda Gary Dewoskin, November 4, 1944 – October 5, 1995) was an American actress.

Career

Live-action appearances
Gary worked as a voice-over artist in animation and also appeared in two live-action films, 1977's Joyride To Nowhere with husband Charles Howerton and 1980's Cruising with Al Pacino. She lent her voice in such movies as Wolfen and Switch.

Radio
Linda played Dr. Maura Cassidy on Lee Hansen's Alien Worlds.

Voice-over work

Early career 
She got her start dubbing Italian films into English while living in Rome with her husband Charles Howerton, then returned to the U.S. in 1974.

Gary started going to voice acting classes taught by Daws Butler. She later claimed "When I got my first voice over job, I just sent Daws the check...He believed in me, and I really have him to thank for my career."

Hanna-Barbera
Gary voiced different characters on several Hanna-Barbera television series: Scooby-Doo and Scrappy-Doo; The Smurfs as Dame Barbara in one episode; Top Cat and the Beverly Hills Cats as Mrs. Vandergelt; The Pirates of Dark Water, where she did additional voices; and Swat Kats: The Radical Squadron as Doctor Abby Sinian. She voiced Queen Morbidia & Nekara in The 13 Ghosts of Scooby-Doo.

ABC Weekend Specials
The ABC Weekend Special was a Saturday morning TV series that aired from 1977 to 1997. It featured stories in both the live-action and animated realms. Gary's voice could be heard on Scruffy, The Puppy Saves the Circus, The Amazing Bunjee Venture, The Return of the Bunjee, The Velveteen Rabbit and The Magic Flute.

Disney
During the 1980s and 90's, Gary did several guest voice-over appearances in such Disney television series as Darkwing Duck, DuckTales, TaleSpin, The Little Mermaid and Bonkers. She voiced a gazelle and a hippo on the Lion King tie-in read-along cassette story The Brightest Star. She also voiced Maleficent and the opening narrator in Fantasmic!. She voiced Muffy Vanderschmere in TaleSpin and  Blender, Floor Lamp and Green Car in The Brave Little Toaster.

Read-Alongs
She narrated Disney read-along stories in 1977: Three Little Pigs, Cinderella, Alice in Wonderland, and It's a Small World. She also narrated a quartet of the Rainbow Brite read-along stories.

Sunbow/Marvel Productions
Gary voiced several additional characters on the 1984 Transformers animated series. She also voiced Raven, a Cobra Night Raven pilot in the G.I. Joe episode "In the Presence of Mine Enemies".

Marvel Productions
Gary voiced Colleen in an episode of the short-lived 1981 Spider-Man with Ted Schwartz as Peter Parker/Spider-Man, and voiced Aunt May in the first season of the 1994-1998 Spider-Man with Christopher Daniel Barnes as Peter Parker/Spider-Man. She was later replaced by Julie Bennett.

Filmation
Her voice acting was mostly for the Filmation studio. She voiced characters in several of Filmation's TV series such as The Kid Super Power Hour with Shazam!, BlackStar, and as the title character in Web Woman.

Gary voiced Jane on an episode of Tarzan, Lord of the Jungle.

She also did voice work on He-Man and the Masters of the Universe (initially miscredited as "Linda Gray") and She-Ra: Princess of Power. She was reunited with fellow voice-over actors Alan Oppenheimer and George DiCenzo from BlackStar. She provided many of the female voices on He-Man such as Teela, Evil-Lyn, the Sorceress of Castle Grayskull and Queen Marlena as well as several from She-Ra like Madame Razz, Glimmer, Shadow Weaver, Scorpia and Entrapta.

She voiced several films for Filmation such as He-Man and She-Ra: The Secret of the Sword, Pinocchio and the Emperor of the Night, He-Man and She-Ra: A Christmas Special and Happily Ever After as Critterina and Marina.

Universal Cartoon Studios
Gary voiced the role of Grandma Longneck in The Land Before Time II: The Great Valley Adventure, The Land Before Time III: The Time of the Great Giving and The Land Before Time IV: Journey Through the Mists. She was later replaced by Miriam Flynn.

Video games
In video games, she provided voices in several adventure games such as King's Quest VI: Heir Today, Gone Tomorrow as the Oracle, Red Chess Queen, Mother Ghost and Queen Allaria, Thayer's Quest as Lady in the Woodlands and Gabriel Knight: Sins of the Fathers as Grandma Knight/Tetelo.

Personal life
Gary was born in Los Angeles, California, on November 4, 1944. She married actor Charles Howerton on December 21, 1967, and had two daughters, Alexis and Dana. Gary was also stepmother to Howerton's daughter from his previous marriage, Lynn Howerton. She died of heart failure and complications of brain cancer on October 5, 1995, at her home in North Hollywood, California, at age 50.

Filmography

Voice over roles

Film

Television

Video games

Live action roles

Film

References

External links

1944 births
1995 deaths
American film actresses
American radio actresses
American television actresses
American video game actresses
American voice actresses
Audiobook narrators
Burials at Mount Sinai Memorial Park Cemetery
Jewish American actresses
Deaths from brain cancer in the United States
Neurological disease deaths in California
Deaths from cancer in California
Actresses from Los Angeles
20th-century American actresses
Disney people
Filmation people
Hanna-Barbera people